Wesley Medical Center, located in Wichita, Kansas, is an acute-care center licensed for 760 beds and 102 bassinets. The medical staff of 900 physicians and 3,000 employees provide a full range of diagnostic and treatment services for patients from throughout Kansas and northern Oklahoma. Every year, more than 25,000 adults and children are inpatients and more than 6,000 babies are born at Wesley. The center was founded in 1912 by the Methodist Church, but has been part of HCA Healthcare since 1985.

An unrelated organization, Wesley Medical Center in Hattiesburg, Mississippi, has 211 licensed beds and is owned by Triad Hospitals, Inc.

Facilities
Wesley's campus in the heart of Wichita, Kansas, includes 
 A critical care building with four adult intensive care units. a freestanding family medicine center, a freestanding birth care building It also includes Wesley Woodlawn Hospital & ER, Wesley West and Wesley Derby, freestanding ERs

Advanced technology and services
Wesley provides a full range of diagnostic and treatment services,; it  is especially noted for:
 The largest emergency department in Kansas, including the only pediatric emergency room in Wichita 
 The Children's Center (affiliated with the National Association of Children's Hospitals and Related Institutions) 
 The Wesley Children's Hospital] with over 50 pediatric specialists and subspecialists 
 Level I Adult and Level II Pediatric Trauma Center
 The area's only Gamma Knife Center
 State-of-the-art Neonatal Intensive Care and Pediatric Intensive Care units
 The area's only hyperbaric oxygen chambers

References

External links
 

Hospital buildings completed in 1912
Teaching hospitals in Kansas
1912 establishments in Kansas
Trauma centers